Franck Pavloff (born 24 April 1940) is a French psychologist, novelist, and poet. Franck Pavloff currently lives in Isère, in eastern France, between trips. His Bulgarian father allowed him to develop a critical mind and his need for freedom, bequeathing him "the imperious taste of barbed wire and shoving confiscated thoughts" (blurb for the short story Brown Morning).

Life experience
He spent over twenty years in Africa, Asia, Latin America, and France working in the fields of community social development and the defence of children's rights. He is a psychologist expert for the Courts of Appeal.

His first novel was published in 1993 by Editions Gallimard in the Série Noire collection. All in all, he wrote 25 other books in the genres of romantic fiction, young adult fiction, and travel diary as well as poetry.

The short story Brown Morning published by Cheyne editions in 1998 has achieved international success, with about two million copies sold in France. It was translated into 25 languages and adapted into an opera in 2007 by composer Bruno Giner.

His last adult novels with published with Albin Michel: The Bridge Ran-Mositar (Albin Michel) Price-France Télévisions in 2005, "The Chapel of Appearances" (2007), "The great exile" (Literary Award for Large spaces, 2009 ), "The man with the bear's shoulders" (released in 2012, Frontier Award Letters in 2013 Readers' Choice Award of Mouans Sartoux in 2013).

Works

Novels, short stories
The wind was crazy, Publisher Gallimard, 2334 Black Series No. 1993
Black heels, Whale Editions, Snapshots collection of Polar 1995
A hole in the area, Whale Publishing, The Octopus 1995
Eyes Bee, Whale Editions 1998
Gare de Lourenço Marques, Whale Editions 1998
 Brown Morning Editions
 Brown (Acorn Book Company, 2003) .
 Brown Morning (Univ of Wisconsin Press, 2004) .
Night wasteland, The Orchard, 2001
A finger of freedom, Hyphen (Quebec), 2001
After me, Hiroshima, Gallimard, 2003 , available from Zulma first edition (2002)
Loincloth sleep Desclée de Brouwer, 2003
High is the tower, Albin Michel, 2003
The Silence of the eagles, Alternatives, 2004
Bridge Ran-Mositar, Albin Michel, 2005
The Chapel of Appearances, Albin Michel, 2007
The Great Banishment, Albin Michel, 2009
Forget me, The Bad Seed, 2010
Pondicherry, Goa, North Carnets 2010
The Man in the Bear build, Albin Michel, 2012
Letters 2013 border price
The Child margins, Albin Michel, 2014

Youth
Pinguino, Publisher Syros, Black Mouse 1994
Lao Wee and Arusha, Syros (I accuse) 1994
The squat resists, Syros (black Mouse), 1996
Menace of the city, Albin Michel, 1998 
Hostage taking in the sun, Nathan (Black Moon), 2000
Stopover in Château-Rouge, Milan, 2002
Until dawn, Bayard (I bouquine), 2004
Eloa when are we going?, Street World, 2005
The Fall of the golden eagle, Fleurus 2006
The Three Gifts, Albin Michel J. (album), 2013

Poetry
Prickly gardens, Ricochet, 2000
Indian exile, Triptych (Quebec), 2001

References

External links
Brown Morning review

20th-century French novelists
21st-century French novelists
20th-century French poets
21st-century French poets
21st-century French male writers
French crime fiction writers
French children's writers
French male short story writers
French short story writers
People from Nîmes
1940 births
Living people
20th-century French male writers